The 2017 Monza FIA Formula 2 round was a pair of motor races held on 2 and 3 September 2017 at the Autodromo Nazionale Monza in Monza, Italy as part of the FIA Formula 2 Championship. It was the ninth round of the 2017 FIA Formula 2 Championship and was run in support of the 2017 Italian Grand Prix.

Classifications

Qualifying

Feature Race

Sprint Race

Championship standings after the round

Drivers' Championship standings

Teams' Championship standings

 Note: Only the top five positions are included for both sets of standings.

References

External links 
 

Monza
Formula 2
Formula 2